Diana da Costa Neves (born 26 February 1987) is an Australian-Portuguese professional basketball player.

College career
In 2005, Neves began her college career at Tusculum College in Tusculum, Tennessee for the Pioneers. Strong showings earned her a transfer to Vanguard University in Costa Mesa, California to play for the Lions.

Professional career

Australia
Neves returned to Australia after college and returned to Gladstone in the Queensland Basketball League. Soon after, Neves made her WNBL debut with the Logan Thunder for the 2010–11 WNBL season. In the QBL, after spending four seasons at Gladstone, Neves joined the Sunshine Coast Clippers for the 2015 season.

Portugal
Neves made her European debut, with Boa Viagem in the Liga Feminina de Basquetebol in Portugal for the 2011–12 season. She would soon after switch to CAB Madeira for the remainder of the season.

National team career
Born in South Africa, Neves then moved to Queensland, Australia at a young age. Neves has dual Australian and Portuguese citizenship due to her parents ancestry. She made her debut for the Portuguese National team at the EuroBasket Women 2011 Division B.

References

1987 births
Living people
Sportspeople from Johannesburg
Guards (basketball)
Citizens of Portugal through descent
Portuguese women's basketball players
Australian women's basketball players
Australian people of Portuguese descent
South African people of Portuguese descent
South African emigrants to Australia
Expatriate basketball people in Australia
Logan Thunder players